The Tezno massacre was the mass killing of POWs and civilians of the Independent State of Croatia (NDH) that took place in Tezno near Maribor, after the end of World War II in Yugoslavia. The killings were perpetrated by units of the Yugoslav Partisans in May 1945, in the Bleiburg repatriations. Summary executions began on 19 May when first prisoners arrived to the Tezno forest from nearby prison camps and continued until 26 May. Most of the bodies were buried in a several kilometers long antitank trench, which the Yugoslav authorities concealed and kept secret.

It is estimated that around 15,000 soldiers and civilians were killed in the massacre. The graves were discovered in 1999 during a highway construction. Additional research of the burial sites was conducted in 2007 by the Commission on Concealed Mass Graves in Slovenia. In 2012, the Slovenian Government unveiled a memorial park at Tezno, where an annual commemoration is held.

Background

In May 1945, at the end of World War II in Yugoslavia, soldiers of the Independent State of Croatia began retreating towards Austria, where British forces were located, with the intention to surrender to them rather than the advancing Yugoslav Partisans. Together with many civilians, the Croatian Armed Forces (HOS) fought their way to the Yugoslav–Austrian border and surrendered on 15 May to the British Army. 

Around 25,000 reached the border, mostly the town of Bleiburg, while around 175,000 were spread in nearby columns that were dozens of miles long. However, the British Army refused their surrender on the grounds that all Axis troops should surrender to the armies they were fighting against. The prisoners of war at the border were thus repatriated to the Yugoslav Partisans.

Forced marches and executions

The captured columns were subjected to forced marches from the border area in northern Slovenia. A large number of prisoners marched towards the town of Maribor, where transit camps were set. The transit centres were located in a military barracks in the Studenci District, an aircraft parts factory in Tezno and several smaller buildings. 

As the columns moved away from the border with Austria, the prisoners were stripped of any valuables and given no food or water. To get to the destination more quickly, those who lagged behind were shot. Some were killed for taking a break or for being too tired to continue walking. In the course of the march, small groups of men were being selected from the columns, led away into the forest and killed. These killings were well organized and the work of entire units of men. Soon the killings of small groups turned into massive scale executions.

The local Partisan headquarters that coordinated the columns was located in Maribor. Organized executions were generally not conducted without the authorization of OZNA (Department of National Security). On 19 May, the Commander of the 3rd Army, Kosta Nađ, ordered the Majevica Brigade of the 17th Division to move to Maribor and subordinate itself to the local OZNA Command.

At the transit camps a selection was made among the prisoners. Some were sent to Zagreb and Celje on forced marches or used as forced labour. Others were sent to Tezno near Maribor, where anti-tank trenches were located that were dug by the Germans during the war. Their length was several kilometers and stretched from the Drava River to the slopes of Pohorje Mountains. Prisoners were taken to the trenches by trucks from the transit sites. Their hands were tied behind their backs with wires and many were stripped of their clothes. Upon arrival, they were lined up on the edge of the trenches and shot. A former Partisan who witnessed the killings gave a description of one of them: 

The executions started on 19 May. Partisan units that conducted them were the Majevica Brigade, 1st, 2nd, and parts of 3rd Battalion of the 6th Eastern Bosnian Brigade, which were all part of the 17th Eastern Bosnian Division of the 3rd Army. The killings lasted continuously for several days and were delayed only in the case if trucks with prisoners were late. When the trenches were full, special squads were ordered to cover them with soil. Some bodies were dug in separate mass graves or craters. The last murders were carried out on 26 May.

Aftermath
The corpses were shallowly buried and in the following weeks and months additional conceals were made. The OZNA made a list of all mass grave sites in Slovenia. Together with the People's Defence Corps of Yugoslavia (KNOJ) they organized covering of the sites with land and plants. Local authorities were informed to prevent any mourning at the graves. Yugoslav authorities kept them secret; for decades, only limited access was allowed to the area. In 1984, it was designated by the government as a location of military cemeteries.

Discovery and investigations of the graves
After the fall of Communism in Yugoslavia, hundreds of unmarked mass graves were found in Slovenia. The Tezno mass graves were found during the construction of a motorway near Maribor in 1999, when workers came upon an anti-tank trench that stretched several kilometres. It was estimated that the part intended for the motorway contained around 600 corpses. 

Subsequent excavations revealed that there were 1,179 corpses in a 70 meter long part of the trench. On average there were 17 corpses found buried along each meter of it. The trench was covered with gravel and lime was found on top of the human remains. Most exhumed corpses indicated that the victims' arms were tied with wire. Individual skulls had visible gunshot wounds. In 1999, the Slovenian police initially estimated there were between 7,000 and 10,000 victims buried in the trenches.

A new exhumation began in 2007. The Commission on Concealed Mass Graves in Slovenia reported that their analysis and conducted probing of what is now a forested area in Tezno found human remains at a length of 940 meters. Based on mathematical calculations and comparisons with the excavations in 1999, it is estimated to contain the remains of around 15,000 victims. The collected documentation and preserved items of victims indicate that they were largely members of the HOS. The historian Mitja Ferenc notes that among the victims were also some members of the Montenegrin National Army, who were incorporated into the HOS that year, and probably a few members of Muslim militias, the German Army, and the Hungarian and Albanian battalions of the HOS (Hungarista legion and Skanderbeg legion). Jože Dežman, head of the Commission on Concealed Mass Graves, referred to Tezno as the largest mass grave in Europe following the end of World War II.

The part of the trench in Tezno in Maribor is officially designated the Tezno Woods 1 Mass Grave. The Tezno Woods 2–6 Mass Graves lie west of the settlement of Dogoše, between the Zlatoličje hydroelectric plant canal and Maribor, and are part of a former antitank trench.

Commemoration

After the discovery of the graves, memorials were erected commemorating the deaths of the victims. In September 2007, the Slovene government started plans to make the mass grave site in Tezno a memorial park and a cemetery. Croatian president Ivo Josipović visited the site in June 2010 and laid wreaths for the victims.

In 2012, under Zoran Milanović's government, the Croatian Parliament decided to revoke funding for the annual Bleiburg commemoration and shifted to a smaller commemoration at the Tezno site. That year, President Josipović, Prime Minister Milanović and Speaker Boris Šprem, as well as Slovenian Prime Minister Janez Janša, visited the location and paid tribute to the victims. 

At the opening of the memorial park in June 2012, the President of Slovenia, Danilo Türk, said:

At the 2015 commemoration, the Croatian leadership condemned all crimes regardless of the ideology in whose name they were committed. After laying a wreath in Tezno, then-Prime Minister Milanović said:

Tezno memorial park

See also
 Mass graves in Slovenia
 Mass graves in Maribor
 Mass killings under communist regimes

Notes

References

External links
Tezno Woods 1 Mass Grave on Geopedia 
Tezno Woods 2 Mass Grave on Geopedia 
Memorial website 

1945 in Slovenia
Massacres in 1945
History of Maribor
Aftermath of World War II in Slovenia
Massacres in Slovenia
Massacres in Yugoslavia
Yugoslav Partisan war crimes in World War II
World War II prisoner of war massacres
Mass graves in Slovenia
Political and cultural purges
Political repression in Communist Yugoslavia
May 1945 events in Europe
Communist terrorism
Mass murder in 1945
Massacres of Croats
Prisoner of war massacres